Sir William Mortimer Clark (also spelled Clarke), KC (May 24, 1836 – August 10, 1915) was a Canadian lawyer and politician.

Life and career
Born in 1836 in Aberdeen, Scotland, Clark was educated at Marischal College and the University of Edinburgh. He came to Canada in 1859 and was called to the bar of Upper Canada in 1861.

A prominent social activist, he became a bank director and authored a number of articles on travel. In 1866, he married Helen Gordon.

Clarke was appointed the ninth Lieutenant Governor of Ontario in 1903. He supported education and hospitals during his mandate, and served until 1908. He was created a Knight Bachelor in 1907.

He died in 1915 in his summer home in Prouts Neck, Maine. His remains were brought back to Toronto, where he was interred in the Mount Pleasant Cemetery.

References

External links
Sir William Mortimer Clark archival papers held at the University of Toronto Archives and Records Management Services

1836 births
1915 deaths
Alumni of the University of Aberdeen
Lawyers in Ontario
Canadian Knights Bachelor
Lieutenant Governors of Ontario
People from Aberdeen
Scottish emigrants to pre-Confederation Ontario
Immigrants to the Province of Canada